NextBSD was an operating system initially based on the trunk version of FreeBSD as of August 2015. It is a fork of FreeBSD which implements new features developed on branches but not yet implemented in FreeBSD. As of 2019 the website seems defunct, and the later commits on GitHub date from October 2019. The Wayback Machine captures of the website after 2016-12-15 are domain squatter pages and as of 2021-03-17 the site is redirecting to a fake "Apple Support" page.

Features
The basic features of launchd, notifyd, asld, and libdispatch work.

These can be installed by cloning the NextBSD repository from GitHub, building GENERIC or MACHTEST kernels, installing a new world on an existing 10.x or CURRENT system, and then following the instructions in the README.

Launchd will start the initial jobs that are part of the repo now.

Planned Features
The project refers to an installer as the first planned milestone on their website.

Future plans include convert to rc and tying notifyd in to potential consumers.

History
NeXTBSD was announced by Jordan Hubbard and Kip Macy in August 2015 at the Bay Area FreeBSD Users Group (BAFUG).

Relationship to FreeBSD
NeXTBSD is based on the FreeBSD-CURRENT kernel while adding in Mach IPC, Libdispatch, notifyd, asld, launchd, and other components derived from Darwin, Apple's open-source code for macOS.

Technology

Basic Architecture

 FreeBSD-current kernel + Mach IPC
 Common Object Runtime (create/delete/retain/release)
 Libdispatch / ASL / Libnotify
 launchd
 launchctl
 json config  files
 legacy rc system
 cooperating daemons

Mach Kernel Abstractions

Tasks
The units of resource ownership; each task consists of a virtual address space, a port right namespace, and one or more threads. (Implemented as an extension to a process.)

Threads
The units of CPU execution within a task. Simple extension to kthreads.

Address space
In conjunction with memory managers, Mach implements the notion of a sparse virtual address space and shared memory. (No modifications)

Memory objects
The internal units of memory management. Memory objects include named entries and regions; they are representations of potentially persistent data that may be mapped into address spaces. (Unsupported)

Ports
Secure, simplex communication channels, accessible only via send and receive capabilities (known as port rights).

IPC
Message queues, remote procedure calls, notifications, semaphores, and lock sets. (Mach semaphores and lock sets are not supported).

Time
Clocks, timers, and waiting - (rudimentary shims).

Standards adherence
Current BSD operating system variants support many of the common IEEE, ANSI, ISO, and POSIX standards, while retaining most of the traditional BSD behavior. Like AT&T Unix, the BSD kernel is monolithic, meaning that device drivers in the kernel run in privileged mode, as part of the core of the operating system.

A selection of significant Unix versions and Unix-like operating systems that descend from BSD includes:
 FreeBSD, an open source general purpose operating system.
 NeXT NEXTSTEP and OPENSTEP, based on the Mach kernel and 4BSD; the ancestor of Mac OS X (macOS)
 Apple Inc.'s Darwin, the core of macOS and iOS; built on the XNU kernel (part Mach, part FreeBSD, part Apple-derived code) and a userland much of which comes from FreeBSD

See also

 FreeBSD
 macOS
 Darwin
 BSD Daemon
 BSD licenses
 Comparison of BSD operating systems
 List of BSD operating systems

References
 NextBSD website - Archive.Org capture of 2016-12-15
 PDF Slide Presentation of the NextBSD basic architecture
 Article about NextBSD y by Michael Larabel in Phoronix magazine
 NextBSD GitHub source repository

Bibliography
 Marshall K. McKusick, Keith Bostic, Michael J. Karels, John S. Quartermain, The Design and Implementation of the 4.4BSD Operating System (Addison Wesley, 1996)
 Marshall K. McKusick, George V. Neville-Neil, The Design and Implementation of the FreeBSD Operating System (Addison Wesley, August 2, 2004)
 Samuel J. Leffler, Marshall K. McKusick, Michael J. Karels, John S. Quarterman, The Design and Implementation of the 4.3BSD UNIX Operating System (Addison Wesley, November 1989)
 
 Peter H. Salus, The Daemon, the GNU & The Penguin (Reed Media Services, September 1, 2008)
 Peter H. Salus, A Quarter Century of UNIX (Addison Wesley, June 1, 1994)
 Peter H. Salus, Casting the Net (Addison-Wesley, March 1995)

External links
 FreeBSD GitHub source repository
 A timeline of BSD and Research UNIX
 UNIX History – History of UNIX and BSD using diagrams
 The Design and Implementation of the 4.4BSD Operating System
 The Unix Tree:  Source code and manuals for old versions of Unix
 EuroBSDCon, an annual event in Europe in September, October or November, founded in 2001 
 BSDCan, a conference in Ottawa, Ontario, Canada, held annually in May since 2004, in June since 2015
 AsiaBSDCon, a conference in Tokyo, held annually in March of each year, since 2007
 mdoc.su — short manual page URLs for FreeBSD, OpenBSD, NetBSD and DragonFly BSD, a web-service written in nginx
 BXR.SU — Super User's BSD Cross Reference, a userland and kernel source code search engine based on OpenGrok and nginx

FreeBSD
Berkeley Software Distribution